Jacek Sempoliński (March 27, 1927August 30, 2012) was a Polish painter, draftsman, art professor, critic, and essayist.

Sempoliński was born in Warsaw.  He studied painting at the Academy of Fine Arts in Warsaw. He taught at his alma mater from 1956.

His works are held in the collections of Zachęta, Museum of Modern Art, Warsaw, BWA Bielsko Biała, Starak Family Foundation

Selected exhibitions 
 2017 - Jacek Sempoliński, Gazing pictures, Manggha, Cracow 
 2002 - A me stesso, Zachęta, Warsaw
 1995 - Jacek Sempoliński. Malarstwo, rysunek, Galeria Kordegarda, Warsaw 
 1983  - Jacek Sempoliński, Czaszka", Poznań Museum of Art

Awards 
 1976 - Jan Cybis Prize, Warsaw
 1986 - Brother Albert Award, Warsaw
 2004 - The Kazimierz Ostrowski Award, Gdańsk
 2012 - Gloria Artis  (Zasłużony Kulturze - Gloria Artis) Medal, Warsaw

References

External links 
 Sempoliński profile on culture.pl
 Sempoliński's works in Zachęta collection
 Sempoliński's works in Museum of Modern Art in Warsaw collection
 Sempoliński's works in BWA Galeria Bielska collection

20th-century Polish painters
20th-century Polish male artists
21st-century Polish painters
21st-century male artists
Polish draughtsmen
1927 births
2012 deaths
Academy of Fine Arts in Warsaw alumni
Academic staff of the Academy of Fine Arts in Warsaw
Polish male painters